The 180th Mixed Brigade was a brigade of the People's Army of the Republic that fought in the Spanish Civil War.

History 
The unit was created on April 30, 1938, on the Andalusia front, being assigned to the 54th Division of the IX Corps. Command fell to Francisco Fervenza Fernández, a veteran of the War in the North.

On June 12 the brigade was sent along with the rest of the division to the Castellón front, aimed at XYZ line. On July 21 the 180th Mixed Brigade saw combat, resulting in a bitter struggle with the nationalist forces advancing towards Valencia. The 720th battalion distinguished itself especially during these operations. After the beginning of the Battle of the Ebro the fighting subsided. In August 1938, command of the brigade was assumed by Manuel Chaves.

It did not intervene in any significant capacity for the remainder of the conflict.

Command 
Commanders
 Francisco Fervenza Fernández;
 Manuel Chaves;

References

Bibliography 
 

 

Military units and formations established in 1938
Military units and formations disestablished in 1939
Mixed Brigades (Spain)